Dharma Durai is a 2016 Indian Tamil-language slice-of-life drama film directed by Seenu Ramasamy. The film stars Vijay Sethupathi with Tamannaah, Aishwarya Rajesh, Srushti Dange, Raadhika Sarathkumar, Ganja Karuppu and Rajesh in supporting roles. Produced by R. K. Suresh and featuring music by Yuvan Shankar Raja, the film began production in December 2015 and was released on 19 August 2016. Amongst other accolades, the film won a prize for Vairamuthu for Best Lyrics at the 64th National Film Awards.

Plot
Dharmadurai (Vijay Sethupathi) is the village drunkard. His antics are a constant source of embarrassment for his brothers and brother-in-law, who run a chit-fund business. The brothers lock him up partially dressed in an empty outhouse most of the time and thrash him whenever he tries to stand up to them. The only people who sympathise with Dharmadurai are his mother Pandiyamma (Raadhika) and his close friend Gopalaswamy (Ganja Karuppu). One day, fed up of his antics, the brothers plot to kill him, however, Pandiyamma overhears her sons and helps Dharmadurai to escape from the outhouse in the middle of the night, advising him to leave the house for good and lead a good life far away from his brothers. With this in mind, Dharmadurai takes his old clothes and bag and leaves for Madurai. However, unknown to him, the bag contains the chit-fund money. When Dharmadurai's brothers find out that he and the money are missing the following morning, they begin a search for him, but give up eventually.

It is then revealed that Dharmadurai is a general doctor and was the first graduate from his village, having pursued his MBBS from Madurai Medical College. During his college days, he was part of a group of friends that included Subhashini (Tamannaah) and Stella (Srushti Dange). Both of them were in love with Dharmadurai, and while Stella openly revealed her feelings for him, Subhashini kept her feelings to herself. He was influenced by one of his lecturers Dr. Kamaraj (Rajesh), who believed in serving the poor and helpless in the villages instead of running after money and foreign employment. Inspired by Dr. Kamaraj's ideas, the three friends decided to stay back in India after graduation, but they soon lost contact with each other. Badly requiring Stella's and Subhashini's support and guidance for his current troubles, Dharmadurai manages to get their current addresses from his old college. First, he goes to Stella's house, only to find out that she is no more, having lost her life in a car accident. Then, he goes to the hospital where Subhashini is working. Subhashini, who is now married to a Hyderabad-based doctor, is alarmed at the change in Dharmadurai. Dharmadurai tells her why he had become an alcoholic.

Following his graduation, Dharmadurai had returned to his village and had set up a clinic there. One day, he encountered Anbuselvi (Aishwarya Rajesh), a farm labourer who had brought some sick elderly village women to his clinic. He was immediately attracted to Anbuselvi and soon asked permission from her father Paraman (M. S. Bhaskar) to marry her, who agreed. Anbuselvi also agreed to marry Dharmadurai and their marriage was fixed. But Dharmadurai's brothers demanded 50-sovereigns gold ornaments and 5,00,000 as dowry from Paraman, who refused to accept their demand and called off the marriage. Heartbroken, Anbuselvi committed suicide. An enraged Dharmadurai, realising that his brothers were the cause of the end of his marriage and Anbuselvi's death, thrashed them mercilessly and was about to kill them, only to be stopped by Pandiyamma. Betrayed and heartbroken, Dharmadurai shut down his clinic and took to alcoholism.

Subhashini, after hearing Dharmadurai's story, takes him to her apartment and nurses him back to sobriety. Following Dharmadurai's recovery, Subhashini reveals to him that she has decided to divorce her husband as he had killed her unborn child, by mixing abortion pills, in the milk she consumed without her knowledge, when she was pregnant, since she had refused to abort the baby and move abroad with him to France as he had desired. She also adds that she is in love with him since their college days. Dharmadurai reciprocates Subhashini's feelings for him and the two enter a live-in relationship, after she divorces her husband. He also resumes his practice in that very town and soon becomes famous for his work towards the poor, helpless and downtrodden. One day, Dr. Kamaraj, who is blind now, upon hearing about Dharmadurai's work, visits him. On the advice of Dr. Kamaraj, he and Subhashini decide to get married. Subashini gets pregnant with Dharmadurai's child. Subhashini also advises him to return to his village, give back the money in bag to his brothers and also to tell them and  mother Pandiyamma that he is going to get married. Dharmadurai agrees and visit back his village.

At his village, Dharmadurai learns that his family had to vacate their house as they were forced to sell it to compensate the villagers, who had found out that their money had been stolen. When he goes to the place where his mother and brothers are now living (a hut in the middle of a field), one of his brothers knocks him out with a spanner, enraged that he had brought them to poverty by stealing the chit fund money. But when he realizes that he had brought back the money, he repents his action. Pandiyamma rushes Dharmadurai to hospital, where he is treated by his batch mate, whom he had attacked in the college. While recuperating at the hospital, he gets a call from Subhashini, asking him to return as soon as possible, and that both Subhashini and the unborn baby are waiting for him.

Cast

 Vijay Sethupathi as Dr. Dharmadurai
 Tamannaah as Dr. Subhashini 
 Aishwarya Rajesh as Anbuselvi
 Srushti Dange as Dr. Stella
 Ganja Karuppu as Gopal
 M. S. Bhaskar as Paraman
 Aruldoss as Beemaraasu
 P. S. Ganesh
 Rajesh as Dr. Kamaraj aka Muniyandi
 Raadhika Sarathkumar as Pandiyamma 
 Soundararaja as Archunan
 Madhuvanti Arun as police inspector
 Vishalini as Dharmadurai's niece
 Florent Pereira as Stella's father
 Saravana Sakthi
 R. K. Suresh in a cameo appearance in Makka Song.
 Seenu Ramasamy in a cameo appearance as Librarian in Andipatti Song.
 Jeeva Subramanian as herself, acted as compounder to Dr. Dharma Durai

Production
In November 2015, Seenu Ramasamy revealed he would direct Vijay Sethupathi in a film to be produced by R. K. Suresh of Studio 9 Productions. Soon after the announcement of the project, Anand Kumaresan, who had begun work on a film titled Vasantha Kumaran with the actor and producer in 2012, made an outburst demanding answers over the postponement of his project. The film had earlier been halted after a fallout between Suresh and Vijay Sethupathi. The makers of Dharma Durai announced that they were in talks with Lakshmi Menon, Aishwarya Rajesh and Gayathrie to play three of the film's four leading female roles.

The film began production in mid-December 2015, with actresses Tamannaah, Sshivada, Aishwarya Rajesh and Srushti Dange announced as a part of the cast. Raadhika would play Sethupathi's mother.

Accolades

Music

The music for Dharma Durai (2016) is composed by Yuvan Shankar Raja. The Tamil album was released at an event held at Sathyam Cinemas, Chennai on 2 August 2016.

References

External links
 

Indian drama films
2016 films
Films scored by Yuvan Shankar Raja
2010s Tamil-language films
Films shot in Madurai
Films directed by Seenu Ramasamy
2016 drama films